The 2014–15 Maryland Terrapins men's basketball team represented the University of Maryland, College Park in the 2014–15 NCAA Division I men's basketball season. They were led by fourth year head coach Mark Turgeon and played their home games at the Xfinity Center. They were first-year members of the Big Ten Conference. They finished the season 28–7, 14–4 in Big Ten play to finish in second place. They advanced to the semifinals of the Big Ten tournament where they lost to Michigan State. They received an at-large bid to the NCAA tournament where they defeated Valparaiso in the second round before losing in the third round to West Virginia.

Previous season
The Terrapins finished the season 17–15, 9–9 in ACC play to finish in a three-way tie for seventh place. They lost in the first round of the ACC Tournament to Florida State.

Pre-season

Departures

Incoming transfers

Class of 2014 signees

Roster

Depth chart

Accolades
Jake Layman
 Second Team All-Big Ten (coaches)
 Third Team All-Big Ten (media)

Varun Ram
 Big Ten Medal of Honor

Melo Trimble
 First Team All-Big Ten (media)
 Second Team All-Big Ten (coaches)
 Big Ten All-Freshman Team
 USBWA Freshman All-American
 ECAC Rookie of the Year

Dez Wells
 First Team All-Big Ten (coaches)
 Second Team All-Big Ten (media)

Mark Turgeon
 Big Ten Coach of the Year (media)

Schedule and results

|-
!colspan=12 style="background:#CE1126; color:#FFFFFF;"| Exhibition

|-
!colspan=12 style="background:#CE1126; color:#FFFFFF;"| Non-conference regular season

|-
!colspan=12 style="background:#CE1126; color:#FFFFFF;"| Big Ten regular season

|-
!colspan=12 style="background:#CE1126; color:#FFFFFF;"| Big Ten tournament'''

|-
!colspan=12 style="background:#cc1122; color:#ffffff;"| NCAA tournament

Rankings

See also
2014–15 Maryland Terrapins women's basketball team

References
umterps.com
ESPN

Maryland Terrapins men's basketball seasons
Maryland
Maryland
Terra
Terra